Ajamil is a village in the province and autonomous community of La Rioja, Spain.

Geography
There are two rivers: Vargas (also called Rabanera) and Vadillos, both tributaries of the Leza from the right.

In the south are located the northern foothills of the Sierra del Hayedo de Santiago, that connects with Cerro Castillo (1,683 m.) towards the west, which together have altitudes above 1,600 m and culminate in Canto Hincado (1,758 m.). This is the highest area of the municipality.

Just west of town is the Sierra de Camero Viejo (1,700, 1,300 m), which defines the town. The relief loses altitudes towards the north and east, (Potezuela, 1510 m., The Madorra. 1,470 m.). In the valleys of the Vadillos and Vargas river basins, the altitudes decrease as the course progresses.

History
In 1366 when Henry II of Castile de Trastámara was crowned king in Calahorra, the Navarro gentleman Juan Ramirez de Arellano received from him the Lordship of Cameros in return for services rendered. Ajamil was among the peoples and places of the said lordship and power passed to the counts of Aguilar and Cameros lords, until the abolition of the feudal system with the Spanish Constitution of 1812.

In the census of the population of Castilla in the 16th century, Ajamil contained, along with Najera, 50 residences, about 300 individuals.
Until the creation of the province of Logroño (by decree of 30 November 1833) the village was exempted and belonged to the province of Soria with its own independent jurisdiction in advance.

Demographics

Population centres
 Ajamil
 Larriba
 Torremuña
 La Aldehuela
 La Edradilla

Economy
The city's economy primarily involves agricultural and livestock production. Agriculture is done on a small scale with production in kitchen gardens of borage, beet, potato, pepper, and fodder.

Livestock is the basis of the local economy, whose cottages comprise cattle and horses. The area of forested land exceeds 5,800 hectares.
There is plenty of hunting, especially for wild boar.

Photo gallery

References

Populated places in La Rioja (Spain)